Notocotylus is a genus of trematodes belonging to the family Notocotylidae.

The genus has almost cosmopolitan distribution.

Species

Species:

Notocotylus aegyptiaca 
Notocotylus atlanticus 
Notocotylus attenuatus

References

Platyhelminthes